Willy Bührer (24 April 1912 – 11 June 1990) was a Swiss athlete. He competed in the men's decathlon at the 1936 Summer Olympics.

References

1912 births
1990 deaths
Athletes (track and field) at the 1936 Summer Olympics
Swiss decathletes
Olympic athletes of Switzerland
Place of birth missing